Aligarh division, also known as Aligarh-city and Kol, is one of the administrative divisions of the Indian state of Uttar Pradesh.

This division consisted of all the districts of the lower Doab:
Aligarh District
Etah District
Hathras District
Kasganj District

Education
Aligarh Muslim University is the premier educational institution in this area.

See also
Districts of Uttar Pradesh

References

 
Divisions of Uttar Pradesh